Mark M. McFarland (born February 1, 1978) is a former NASCAR driver who works for Kyle Busch Motorsports as the crew chief for their No. 18 car in the ARCA Menards Series and ARCA Menards Series East. In 2021, he won championships in both series with Ty Gibbs and Sammy Smith, respectively. In 2022, he and Smith won their second consecutive East Series championship.

Racing career

Early career

At the age of eight, he began his racing career, racing go-karts. He earned a factory ride after his first year of racing. In 1994, his karting career ended with 10 National Championships and 14 State Championships to his name.

At the end of 1995, he started racing late models at Old Dominion Speedway in Manassas, Virginia. He was rookie of the year in 1996, and finished third in points. In the 1997 season, he captured 9 wins, and 27 top 10 finishes, at several tracks throughout the south. He finished second at points at Old Dominion.

NASCAR

Weekly series
In 2003, driving an asphalt Late Model Stock Car McFarland won 16 of his 18 starts at Old Dominion Speedway in Manassas, Virginia. This earned him the national championship of the NASCAR Weekly Series, as well as the track championship.

As part of the 25th anniversary of the NASCAR Weekly Series in 2006, McFarland was named one of the series' All Time Top 25 drivers.

National series

In 1998, he ran select NASCAR Busch Series events, along with 15 late model races throughout the east coast. He qualified for several Busch Series events. In 1999, he did not run any NASCAR events, but finished fourth in points at Old Dominion, and set a new track and LMSC record of 15.222 (88.687 MPH), which still stands today. He continued to run late model and off and on Busch Series events through the 2003 season, when he won the national championship for LMSC in NASCAR. In 2004, he raced first for Jim Harris in the Craftsman Truck Series in the Harris Trucking Dodge. Then about mid season, he was picked to be one of the 4 Hungry Driver drivers in Tommy Baldwin Racing's No. 6 Busch Series Dodge's.

He then moved into the USAR Hooters Pro Cup Series in 2005 driving the Winfuel No. 32 Chevy for Dale Earnhardt Jr. Ken Barlow hand-picked Jefferson Hodges as the teams crew chief, saying, "Jefferson did a fabulous job building and leading this new team with knowledge and a true craftsmanship".

In 2006, McFarland was hired to drive the No. 88 United States Navy Chevrolet for JR Motorsports in the NASCAR Busch Series. He was injured while running in the top 10 at the Milwaukee Mile and missed the next two races at Daytona International Speedway and Chicagoland Speedway. He had dislocated his shoulder and also injured some of the muscles around it.

Following the Kroger 200, he was released from his driving duties of the No. 88 U.S. Navy Chevrolet. Martin Truex Jr. would drive the car in the next race at Watkins Glen International and Robby Gordon drove it in subsequent races at Michigan International Speedway and California Speedway. Shane Huffman, also from the Hooters Pro Cup Series, drove the remaining races in the No. 88.

Crew chiefing career

McFarland served as a crew chief for Ben Rhodes when Rhodes won the 2014 NASCAR K&N Pro Series East season. For 2015, McFarland served as crew chief for Justin Haley's East Series team.

He served as the general manager for his partly-owned team, MDM Motorsports, for two years. The team would close down prior to the 2019 season. McFarland would then join Joe Gibbs Racing as the team's crew chief for its ARCA Menards Series No. 18 car, driven by Riley Herbst, Ty Gibbs and Todd Gilliland. He won the 2021 main ARCA Series championship with Gibbs and the 2021 ARCA Menards Series East championship with Sammy Smith. In 2022, McFarland remained the crew chief of the No. 18 car in ARCA, now owned by Kyle Busch Motorsports. With Ty Gibbs moving up to the Xfinity Series full-time in 2022, Drew Dollar and Sammy Smith shared the car in the main ARCA Series and Smith drove the car full-time in the East Series. Smith and McFarland won their second consecutive East Series championship together that year.

Motorsports career results

NASCAR
(key) (Bold – Pole position awarded by qualifying time. Italics – Pole position earned by points standings or practice time. * – Most laps led.)

Busch Series

Craftsman Truck Series

Camping World East Series

References

External links
 
 

1978 births
Living people
NASCAR drivers
CARS Tour drivers
People from Winchester, Virginia
Racing drivers from Virginia
NASCAR crew chiefs
Joe Gibbs Racing drivers
JR Motorsports drivers